Mahmoud Samimi (born 18 September 1988) is an Iranian discus thrower. He was born in Shahrekord.

He is the younger brother of Abbas and Mohammad Samimi.

Competition record

References
 

1988 births
Living people
Iranian male discus throwers
Athletes (track and field) at the 2016 Summer Olympics
Olympic athletes of Iran
Universiade medalists in athletics (track and field)
Universiade silver medalists for Iran
Competitors at the 2013 Summer Universiade
Competitors at the 2015 Summer Universiade
Medalists at the 2009 Summer Universiade
21st-century Iranian people